Deh-e Chahar Dari (also Romanized as Deh-e Chahār Darī) is a village in Margan Rural District, in the Central District of Hirmand County, Sistan and Baluchestan Province, Iran. At the 2006 census, its population was 260, in 54 families.

References 

Populated places in Hirmand County